Chak No. 1 is a village in Mandi Bahauddin Tehsil, Mandi Bahauddin District, Punjab, Pakistan. It derives its name from the railway station built near Chillianwala on the line between Lalamusa, Malakwal and Sargodha.
 
Chilianwala was the site of an 1849 battle in the Second Anglo-Sikh War, ending without decisive victory but causing the British military to re-evaluate its ambitions in India.

References

Villages in Mandi Bahauddin District